Schwartziella bouryi is a species of minute sea snail, a marine gastropod mollusk or micromollusk in the family Zebinidae. The taxonomic validity of this species is uncertain.

Distribution
This species occurs in the Caribbean Sea and the Gulf of Mexico.

Description 
The maximum recorded shell length is 3 mm.

Habitat 
Minimum recorded depth is 0 m. Maximum recorded depth is 10 m.

References

 Rosenberg, G., F. Moretzsohn, and E. F. García. 2009. Gastropoda (Mollusca) of the Gulf of Mexico, Pp. 579–699 in Felder, D.L. and D.K. Camp (eds.), Gulf of Mexico–Origins, Waters, and Biota. Biodiversity. Texas A&M Press, College Station, Texas

bouryi
Gastropods described in 1949